Transport Hotel is a bar located near the south-west corner of Federation Square, Melbourne, Victoria, Australia. The hotel was designed by Maddison Architects in 2004.It was the first new pub site in Melbourne in over 50 years.

References

External links

Melbourne